Yousra (born Seveen Nessim) is an Egyptian actress and singer. She is considered as a glamorous icon for the Middle East and is an influential voice in the region.

Career 
Yousra participated as a main Role actress in almost 81 Cinema Movies, 20 Drama Serials and 3 Live Theater Performances.
She first appeared in the 1980 film Athkiya' Laken Aghbiya (Smart yet Stupid). Then she played many roles with varying looks – the naughty, quiet, docile, or impish. Yousra participated in comedy, drama, and entertainment.
Kasr Fi El Hawaa (Castle In the Air) by Abdel Halim Nasr in 1980.
 Fatah Tabhath Ann Alhob (A Girl Looking for Love) by Nader Galal in 1977.
Alf Bossa Wa Bossa (A Thousand and One Kisses) by Mohamed Abdel Aziz in 1977.
Ebtessama Waheda Takfi (One Smile is Enough) by Mohamed Bassiyouni in 1978, to mention just a few.

These were followed by a number of successful films with Adel Emam such as:
Shabab Yarkoss Fawk Alnar (Youth Dancing on Fire) by Yehiya Al Alamy in 1978
Al Ensan Yaeesh Mara Waheda (Man Only Lives Once) by Simone Saleh in 1981
Ala Bab Al Wazeer (At the Door of the Minister) by Mohamed Abdel Aziz in 1982
Al Avocato (The Lawyer) by Raafat Al Mihi in 1984
Al Ins Wa Algen by Mohamed Radi in 1985, and Karakoun Fi El Shareih.
The duo of Adel Imam and Yousra, always made an interesting movie with a message and a lot of laughter.
Then she had the chance to act alongside Salah Zulfikar in Imra’a Lil Asaf (Unfortunately Woman) in 1988.

Later, Adel Emam and Yousra worked together in three different movies: Al Mansi (The Forgotten), Al Irhab Wal Kabab (Terrorism and Kebab), and Toyour Al Zalam (Birds of Darkness). In all three movies, comedy was used to deliver an underlying political message to great critical and public acclaim.

One of the most important milestones in Yousra's career was working with the famous Egyptian director Youssef Chahine. She acted in Chahine's Hadduta Masreya (Egyptian Story) in 1982, Iskanderiya Kaman we Kaman (Alexandria Again and Again) in 1990, and Al Mohager (The Emigrant) in 1994. Yousra was very impressed with Chahine's work, stating, "Youssef Chahine affected me on a personal and professional level. He is a school for anyone who works with him.”

Yousra made a number of the serial television dramas popular during Ramadan, including 2005's Ahlam 'Adiya (Ordinary Dreams).  She portrayed an enterprising con woman in what the English version of Egyptian newspaper Al-Ahram called “a major departure from the star's usual Ramadan screen persona, which has consistently verged on the romantic and the demure."

In 2006, she took a supporting role in The Yacoubian Building, a star-laden adaptation of the novel of the same name.  The film is reported to have had the highest budget of any Egyptian production to date. Playing an entertainer working in a restaurant, Yousra, according to Variety, “effortlessly stirs old emotional waters when she sings 'La vie en rose.'"

Yousra released her first vocal album in 2002. She featured in Abu's hit single 3 Daqat in 2017.

In 2018, she acted in Ladayna Akwalon Okhra (We Have Another Statement). In 2019, Yousra and Saba Mubarak starred in a photo session for Harper's Bazaar Arabia, and both Arab actresses wore elegant evening gowns.
In 2020, she starred in Saheb Al Maqam, her first film in eight years.

Personal life 

Yousra is the sister-in-law of actor Hesham Selim, son of famous Egyptian football player, actor and former president of Al Ahly, Saleh Selim, and the wife of Khaled Selim.

She has no children.

Political views 
Despite all the troubles and the tension between Algeria and Egypt after 2009 Egypt–Algeria World Cup dispute, the Egyptian actress Yousra cheered for Algeria in the World Cup which was held in South Africa. She and Omar Sharif initially staged a protest against Algeria after Algeria accused Egypt of misconduct during the Algeria-Egypt football match.

Filmography

Television 

Hikayat aruus wa aruusah
Story of bride and groom

References

External links 
 
 The Yacoubian Building at the Tribeca Film Festival
 Marefa – Yosra's biography
 Yousra's Facebook page

1955 births
Living people
Egyptian film actresses
20th-century Egyptian women singers
Feminist musicians
Egyptian television actresses
Singers who perform in Egyptian Arabic
Actresses from Cairo
Singers from Cairo